Kalathukadavu is a serene, fast developing village abutting Meenachil river in Kottayam district of Kerala, India.  Kalathukadavu is situated between Erattupetta and Thodupuzha on a state highway. The main landmarks are St. John Vianney Church and St. Alphonsa Lower Primary school. A farming village known for cultivation of cash crops and rubber, it is emerging as a popular residential neighbourhood, with a plethora of shops selling building materials and all kinds of consumables. A bridge across the main tributary of Meenachil river connects Kalathukadavu with Moonnilavu and Chakiniyamthadam. The nearby places from here are Elappunkal, Erattupetta, Palai, Thodupuzha, Melukavu, Monkombu, Thalanadu and Chakiniyamthadam

References

Villages in Kottayam district